George Bisharat (born 1954) is an American professor of law and frequent commentator on current events in the Middle East, and the Israeli–Palestinian conflict in particular.

Life 

Bisharat was born in Topeka, Kansas to a Palestinian father, Dr. Maurice Bisharat from Talbiya, Jerusalem (whose Palestinian Christian family originally came from Rafidia) and an American mother Mary Johnson. He earned his B.A. in anthropology from UC-Berkeley in California and his M.A. in history from Georgetown University in Washington, DC, before going on to graduate cum laude from Harvard Law School. In 1987, he earned a PhD in Anthropology and Middle East Studies from Harvard University.

Bisharat served as deputy Public Defender for the city of San Francisco from 1987 to 1991, and in 1989, he published the book Palestinian Lawyers and Israeli Rule: Law and Disorder in the West Bank (University of Texas Press). In 1991, Bisharat became Professor of Law at the University of California's Hastings College of the Law in San Francisco, California, a position he continues to hold. He has also worked with the Palestinian Legislative Council on efforts to reform and develop the Palestinian judiciary system, and is a member of the editorial board of the Journal of Palestine Studies.

Views 
Bisharat is a commentator on the Middle East and the legal and human rights aspects of the Israeli-Palestinian conflict, and his written commentaries have been published in U.S. and international media. He was an  critic of Israel's conduct during its 2006 war with Lebanon, and has been a defender of the right of return of Palestinian refugees who were expelled or fled from their homes in 1948 during the creation of the State of Israel.

Bisharat  supports  the possibility a one-state solution to the Israeli–Palestinian conflict, and is working on a book addressing the legal aspects of that solution. He supports a boycott of Israel, arguing in a 2007 editorial published by the San Francisco Chronicle that a boycott was "both necessary and justified" by Israel's continued occupation of Palestinian Territories.

Bisharat has argued in the Wall Street Journal and the New York Times that Israel's actions in the 2008–2009 Israel–Palestine conflict over Gaza constitute war crimes.

References 

 University of California Hastings College of the Law Faculty
 "Dr. George Bisharat discusses "The Power of Apology" at UCLA Palestine Week Event", The Washington Report on Middle East Affairs, June 2004
 "Boycott movement targets Israel", George Bisharat, The San Francisco Chronicle, 15 August 2007
 "40th Anniversary of the Six-Day War: Solution on which all agree impossible to achieve", George Bisharat, The San Francisco Chronicle, 4 June 2007

Living people
American people of Palestinian descent
UC Berkeley College of Letters and Science alumni
Georgetown University Graduate School of Arts and Sciences alumni
Harvard Law School alumni
University of California, Hastings faculty
1954 births
Public defenders